Evelyn Schmied-Wadda (15 December 1965 - 17 December 2019) was an Austrian Paralympic athlete who competed at international track and field competitions. She was a Paralympic bronze medalist, World silver medalist and a European champion.

Schmied-Wadda died of terminal cancer in a hospice in Rennweg.

References

1965 births
2019 deaths
Athletes from Vienna
Paralympic athletes of Austria
Austrian female discus throwers
Austrian female shot putters
Austrian female javelin throwers
Paralympic discus throwers
Paralympic shot putters
Paralympic javelin throwers
Wheelchair discus throwers
Wheelchair shot putters
Wheelchair javelin throwers
Athletes (track and field) at the 2000 Summer Paralympics
Athletes (track and field) at the 2004 Summer Paralympics
Medalists at the 2000 Summer Paralympics
Paralympic bronze medalists for Austria